St. Mark's Episcopal Church is a historic church complex at 73 Columbia Road in the Dorchester neighborhood of Boston, Massachusetts.  The complex consists of three buildings: a chapel, rectory, and parish hall.  All three were built between 1904 and 1909, with the last significant alteration to the exterior of the church occurring in 1916.  All three buildings were designed by Edmund O. Sylvester, and present a unified architectural statement of Craftsman styling with some English Gothic (Tudor Revival) detailing. The church complex was listed on the National Register of Historic Places in 2014.

The congregation was established as a mission in 1887 after fire destroyed the St. Mary's Church on Bowdoin Street on June 15, and a portion of its congregation began to meet in the Grove Hall area of Dorchester. St. Mary's Mission carried on until October 31, 1897. An independent mission was organized a week later, which adopted the name "St. Mark's" on March 13, 1898, and which acquired land on Columbia Road to build a church in early October. The cornerstone for the new church was laid April 25, 1904, and the first service held on September 18. The congregation was formally incorporated as a parish on January 15, 1906.

Parish Leadership
 The Rev. Henry Martyn Saville - Minister-in-Charge, 1898-1906
 The Rev. Henry Martyn Saville - Rector, 1906-1907
 The Rev. Frank Dorr Budlong - Rector, 1907-1918
 The Rev. Robert Eliot Marshall - Rector, 1930-????
 The Rev. Burdette Landsdowne - Rector, 1944-????
 The Rev. R. J. Carlson - Rector, 1957-????
The Rev. Dr. Thomas W. O. Mayers - Rector, 1991-2008
 The Rev. Cathy H. George - Priest-in-Charge, 2008-2011
 The Rev. Dr. James K. Githitu -  Rector, 2011-2016

See also
National Register of Historic Places listings in southern Boston, Massachusetts
Episcopal Church (United States)

References

External links
Episcopal Church page on the church

Dorchester, Boston
Episcopal church buildings in Massachusetts
Churches completed in 1904
Religious organizations established in 1887
20th-century Episcopal church buildings
National Register of Historic Places in Boston
Churches on the National Register of Historic Places in Massachusetts
American Craftsman architecture in Massachusetts